Richard Mathey (born June 27, 1987) is an American professional wrestler who currently competes on the independent circuit and also wrestles for Lucha Underground and Championship Wrestling from Hollywood.

Professional wrestling career

Lucha Underground (2014–2019)
Mathey debuted on Lucha Underground in a dark match on October 15, 2014 in a losing effort to Hernandez as a jobber. He would however, qualify for the Aztec Warfare match for the Lucha Underground Championship, but was unsuccessful. During the first two seasons of Lucha Underground, Mandel also wrestled under a mask as Trece, one-third of the Disciples of Death Trios team, along with Barrio Negro, and Sinestro de la Muerte, though Mandel was not acknowledged to be the man under the mask. On the April 20, 2016 episode of Lucha Underground, the character of Trece, along with Barrio Negro, was killed off, when Sinestro de la Muerte turned on his partners, and ripped their hearts out. Ricky Mandel has since returned as a Johnny Mundo devotee, changing his ringname to Ricky Mundo.

Championships and accomplishments
Arizona Wrestling Federation
AWF State Championship (1 time)
Championship Wrestling From Hollywood
CWFH Heritage Heavyweight Championship (1 time)
Lucha Society of America
LSA World Heavyweight Championship (1 time)
Lucha Underground
Lucha Underground Trios Championship (1 time) – with Barrio Negro and El Siniestro de la Muerte
Maverick Pro Wrestling
MPW Championship (1 time)
SoCal Pro Wrestling 
SCP Heavyweight Championship (2 times)
SCP Golden State Championship (3 times)
SCP Tag Team Championship (2 times) – with Hector Canales (1) and Tommy Wilson (1)
Summer Classic Tournament (2012)

References

External links 
 
 

1987 births
Living people
People from Berwyn, Illinois
American male professional wrestlers
Professional wrestlers from Illinois
21st-century professional wrestlers
Lucha Underground Trios Champions